Clifford Dukes (born June 26, 1981) is an American arena football defensive lineman who is currently a free agent. He played college football at Michigan State from 2000 to 2004. He was signed as an undrafted free agent by the St. Louis Rams in 2005. Dukes has also been a member of the New Orleans Saints. After not having a chance to play in the NFL, Dukes signed with the Tampa Bay Storm of the AFL in 2008. In 2010, he saw his first chance for real playing time with the Storm. As a result, he was named to the All-Arena team in 2010. In 2011, he led  the league with 12.5 sacks and was named the 2011 Game Tape Exchange Defensive Lineman of the Year. He was traded to the Kansas City Command in 2012, only to be traded to the Arizona Rattlers two days later.

Early life
Born the son of Gloria Dukes, Cliff attended Great Mills High School in Great Mills, Maryland. There he was a standout member of the football team according to his coaches and peers. A two ways player, he played both fullback and linebacker. On defense his senior season, he recorded 105 tackles (56 solos, 49 assists), including eight for losses, and intercepted two passes, while also forced four fumbles and recovered three. On offense, he rushed for 619 yards on 119 carries and scored seven touchdowns.

College career
Upon high school graduation, Dukes accepted a football scholarship to Michigan State University where he majored in family community services, and was a member of the football team.

Professional career

Tampa Bay Storm
After not having a chance to play in the NFL, Dukes signed with the Tampa Bay Storm of the AFL in 2008. In 2010, he saw his first chance for real playing time with the Storm. As a result, he was named to the All-Arena team in 2010. In 2011, he led  the league with 12.5 sacks and was named the 2011 Game Tape Exchange Defensive Lineman of the Year.

Kansas City Command
On February 7 2012, Dukes was traded to the Kansas City Command in 2012, for quarterback Stephen Wasil.

Arizona Rattlers
On February 9, 2012, Dukes was traded by the Command to the Arizona Rattlers for defensive back J. C. Neal. Dukes helped the Rattlers reach ArenaBowl XXVI in 2013, where they defeated the Soul for their second consecutive championship.

Baltimore Brigade
On July 26, 2018, Dukes was assigned to the Baltimore Brigade, just days prior to ArenaBowl XXXI.

References

External links
Toronto Argonauts bio 
St. Louis Rams bio
Michigan State Spartans bio

1981 births
Living people
American players of Canadian football
American football defensive linemen
Canadian football defensive linemen
Michigan State Spartans football players
St. Louis Rams players
New Orleans Saints players
Tampa Bay Storm players
Toronto Argonauts players
Kansas City Command players
Arizona Rattlers players
Baltimore Brigade players
Players of American football from Maryland